Bridget Neval (born 13 February 1985) is a retired Australian-born Canadian actress. She has been in various television programs including Wicked Science and but is most famous for her portrayal of Lana Crawford in Neighbours.

Personal life
Neval was born in India and lived there for a few months before moving to Canada. She then moved to Australia at the age of 13. This has resulted in her having a unique accent which is a mixture of Australian and Canadian. Her father is Canadian and her mother is Australian.

In March 2011, Neval married Amos Phillips in Byron Bay, NSW, Australia. She has legally changed her name to Bridget Phillips. In December 2011, she began contributing articles to Bon Vivant, an Australian comedy website.

On her personal blog and elsewhere, Neval has spoken about her history of depression and eating disorders. She cites this as her main reason for leaving the acting industry.

Acting career

Guinevere Jones
This was the first role in which Neval was a main cast member. She played Reine Davidson, the nemesis of protagonist Guinevere Jones and her friends. There were 2 seasons of this program with a total of 26 episodes filmed all of which first aired in 2002

Wicked Science
She also portrays teenage genius Elizabeth Hawke (lead role) in Wicked Science (2003–2005), an Australian-produced children's series. In the series Elizabeth Hawke and Toby Johnson became geniuses after a science experiment went wrong. Elizabeth had previously been a quiet nerd but she uses her new-found intelligence for evil, making her the villain of the program. Only fellow genius Toby can stop her from hurting innocent people. The first series of Wicked Science won 2004 AFI Award for Best Children's Television Drama. First season was produced in 2002–2003 and the second in 2004–2005.

Neighbours
Neval played Lana Crawford in Neighbours (2004–05) who was the series' first lesbian character. She later returned for Neighbours' 35th Anniversary on 18 March 2020. She later appeared for the last episode on 28 July 2022.

Chasing Pegasus
Performed as part of the Melbourne Fringe Festival, the play opened on 3 October 2006. Written and directed by Sally McLean, Chasing Pegasus focuses on a night in the lives of ten members of the Serendipity Book Club. Bridget plays the role of Amelia, a sixteen-year-old.

Damned by Dawn
Filmed in 2006, Damned by Dawn is an Australian horror film released in America on Blu-ray and DVD on 9 November 2010. Neval played the role of The Banshee, a ghostly spirit whose eerie cries awaken the dead.

Crawlspace
Crawlspace is an Australian horror movie filmed in 2012, directed and written by Justin Dix (Damned by Dawn). She is credited as "Banshee".

References

External links
 

1985 births
Living people
Australian television actresses
Canadian television actresses
Australian people of Canadian descent